The Exalted Order of the Crown of Kedah (Bahasa Melayu: Darjah Yang Maha Mulia Sri Mahkota Kedah)  is an honorific order of the Sultanate of Kedah

History 
It was founded by Sultan Abdul Halim of Kedah on 21 February 1964.

Classes 
It is awarded in four classes: 
 Knight Grand Commander or Dato' Sri Paduka Mahkota Kedah - SPMK
 The male titular has right to the prefix Dato' Seri and his wife, to the prefix Toh Puan
 Knight Commander or Dato' Paduka Mahkota Kedah - DPMK
 The male titular has right to the prefix Dato' and his wife, to the prefix Datin
 Companion or Setia Mahkota Kedah - SMK
 Member or Ahli Mahkota Kedah - AMK

Award conditions 
 Knight Grand Commander or Dato' Sri Paduka - SPMK.This Order is conferred on those of high position and standing who are well known for their excellence in the performance of their duties, in whatever field of service, to the State and the Nation. The recipient is dubbed with the title, "Dato' Seri". This is considered the highest Order, and it may be held by only 20 persons at one time. 
 Knight Commander or Dato' Paduka - DPMK This Order ranks second to the Darjah Yang Mulia Seri Mahkota, and is conferred on those who have, for a number of years, performed meritorious deeds with great responsibility to the State and Nation. It is awarded to those of high position and great influence. Conferment of this Order is limited to 100 persons only. For government officers, this Order is only given to those in the Management and Professional level or those of similar status.

Insignia 
 Knight Grand Commander or Dato' Seri - SPMK . Photo.  The insignia is composed of a collar, a badge hanging from a sash and a breast star. 
 Knight Commander or Dato' - DPMK. Photos : Men & Women   The former insignia was composed of a badge hanging from a sash with reversed colours to make a difference, and a breast star.  The current insignia of a male titular is composed of a badge hanging from a collar sash and a breast star  The current insignia of a female titular is composed of a badge hanging from a breast knot and a breast star
 Companion or Setia - SMK. Photos : Men & Women   The insignia of a male titular is composed of a badge hanging from a collar sash.   The insignia of a female titular is composed of a badge hanging from a breast knot.
 Member or Ahli - AMK. Photos : Kedah  The insignia is composed of a badge hanging from a ribbon.

Notable recipients 

Sultan Abdul Halim of Kedah: 
  Founding Grand Master and Knight Grand Commander (SPMK, with title : Dato' Seri) of the Exalted Order of the Crown of Kedah (SPMK-DPMK-SMK-AMK, since 21 Feb. 1964)

Members of the Royal Family of Kedah : 
   Knight Grand Commander of the Exalted Order of the Crown of Kedah with title : Dato' Seri (SPMK, Max. 20 pers.)
 late Tuanku Bahiyah DMN SMN DK DKH SPMK (1st wife of the Sultan Abdul Halim) (SPMK, 19.2.1971)   
 Tunku Abdul Malik, Raja Muda DK DKH DMK SPMK PSB (1st younger brother of the Sultan and heir prince of Kedah) (SPMK, 29.2.1964)  
 Tunku Annuar, Tunku Bendahara PSM DKH DMK SPMK SSDK PSB (2nd ygr br. of the Sultan and head of the Regency Council 2011) (SPMK) 
 Tunku Hamidah  SPMK SSDK SMS (eldest daughter of Sultan Badlishah of Kedah) (SPMK, 17.7.2008)

Lists of recipients 
 List of honours of the Kedah Royal Family by country
 List of Honours of Kedah awarded to Heads of State and Royals

References 

Orders, decorations, and medals of Kedah
Kedah